The Connecticut Department of Emergency Services and Public Protection is a statewide law agency of Connecticut for law enforcement, fire services, and scientific services. Its headquarters are in Middletown. The current commissioner is James C. Rovella. 
The Department of Emergency Services and Public Protection was created due to a statewide reorganization of state agencies. The reorganization dissolved the Department of Public Safety,  merged the Commission on Fire Prevention and Control, dissolved the Department of Emergency Management and Homeland Security (DEMHS) and merged the Police Officer Standards and Training Council (POST).

DESPP Divisions

 Commission on Fire Prevention and Control
 Connecticut State Police
 Emergency Management and Homeland Security
 Police Officer Standards and Training Council
 Scientific Services
 Statewide Emergency Telecommunications

References

External links

 Connecticut Department of Emergency Services and Public Protection
Notable Speech - Real Heroes FBI

State law enforcement agencies of Connecticut